Cystopteris fragilis is a species of fern known by the common names brittle bladder-fern and common fragile fern. It can be found worldwide, generally in shady, moist areas. The leaves are up to 30 or 40 centimeters long and are borne on fleshy petioles with few or no long hairs. Each leaf is divided into many pairs of leaflets, each of which is subdivided into lobed segments. The underside of the leaf has many rounded sori containing the sporangia.

References

External links
Jepson Manual Treatment: Cystopteris fragilis
USDA Plants Profile: Cystopteris fragilis
Flora of North America: Cystopteris fragilis
Cystopteris fragilis — U.C. Photo gallery

fragilis
Ferns of Asia
Ferns of Europe
Ferns of the Americas
Ferns of Canada
Ferns of the United States
Ferns of California
Flora of England
Flora of Finland
Flora of Lebanon
Flora of Russia
Flora of the Sierra Nevada (United States)
Flora of South Georgia Island
Biota of South Georgia and the South Sandwich Islands
Plants described in 1805